Josephine Cushman Bateham (Penfield; after first marriage, Cushman, after second marriage, Bateham; pen name, Mrs. J. C. Bateham; November 1, 1829 – March 15, 1901) was an American social reformer, editor, and writer in the temperance movement. The Sabbath Observance Department of the National Woman's Christian Temperance Union (WCTU) was organized at the St. Louis (National) Convention in 1884, and Bateham, then of Painesville, Ohio, was appointed its first Superintendent, continuing in charge of the Department until compelled by failing health to resign in 1896. In addition, Bateham was a supporter of social reform for women.

Early life and education
Josephine Abiah Penfield was born in Alden, New York, November 1, 1829. Her parents were Anson and Minerva (Dayton) Penfield. She had one sister and four brothers. Josephine descended from New England ancestry. The attractions of Oberlin College and the desire to help the young colony and educate their children drew her parents from New York state to Oberlin, Ohio, when Bateham was five years old. Her father was killed in an accident in 1838. Two siblings died before 1844, when her mother married Oberlin College professor, Henry Cowles. Cowles, her stepfather, was the author of Cowles' Bible Commentaries; she became a number of the Ladies' Board of Managers of the college. 

Bateham graduated from Oberlin College in 1847, with an L.B. degree.

Career
For a year, she taught at a local school. On July 20, 1848, she married Rev. Richard S. Cushman, of Attleboro, Massachusetts, and went on a foreign mission to Saint-Marc, Haiti. Alter eleven months of laborious service Mr. Cushman died, and unable to carry on the new mission single-handed. Josephine reluctantly resigned the work and returned home, a widow at nineteen years of age. 

She returned to Oberlin and taught for a short time at Oberlin College. On September 27, 1850, she married Michael Boyd Bateham (1813–1880), head of the Ohio State Board of Agriculture. He was also the founder, editor, and publisher of the Ohio Cultivator in Columbus, Ohio. They resided in Columbus fourteen years, spending part of their summers in travel in Europe and the United States. Having previously been a contributed to the Oberlin Evangelist, Bateham became the editor of the  Ohio Cultivators ladies department, while Frances Dana Barker Gage was an associate editor. Bateman wrote articles on dress, education, exercise, gardening, health, housekeeping, peace, and woman's rights. She continued to be a contributor to the Ohio Cultivator after her husband sold it in 1855; it merged with the Ohio Farmer in 1864. 

Mr. and Mrs. Bateham participated in the Ohio State Peace Society and were delegates to the 1851 international peace congress held in London. Always foremost in church and reform work and widely known by her writings, her hospitable home was a center of attraction.

In 1864, they removed to Painesville, Ohio, for the benefit of Mr. Bateham's health, where they ran a fruit farm. There, for sixteen years, Mrs. Bateham devoted herself to her growing family, to writing, as well as to missionary and temperance work, her husband always encouraging her literary and reform efforts.

After she was widowed, she did the work of both parents. One child, twelve years old, died.  

At the opening of the Women's Temperance Crusade in Ohio, in 1874, Bateham became the leader of the Painesville crusade band, and later, one of the leaders in the State WCTU. Beginning in 1884, Bateham served as national superintendent of the WCTU's Department for the Suppression of Sabbath Desecration, and her eldest daughter, Minerva Dayton Bateham, was her secretary till her death, in 1885, after eighteen years of invalidism. At Bateham's request, the name was changed to "Department of Sabbath Observance". In 1896, owing to failing health, Bateham was forced to decline renomination.

Bateham removed to Asheville, North Carolina, in 1890, where she devoted her time to the work of the WCTU. In that year, she traveled 
, in nearly every U.S. state and U.S. territory and through the Hawaiian Islands, giving nearly 300 lectures. She wrote many leaflets on Sabbath questions, of which she sent out more than a million pages every year. She was a natural leader, organizer, writer and speaker. On behalf of the "Sunday-law combination" in the U.S., Bateham asked the U.S. Congress to incorporate the dogma of Sunday idleness into a Federal statute.

Personal life
From 1892 to 1897, she lived in Williamsburg, Kentucky with daughter Sarah. In 1897, she removed to Norwalk, Ohio, where two other children made their homes.

The Batehams had seven children: Anson, Minerva (Minnie), Josephine, Lizzie, Sarah, Henry, and Charles. In religion, Mrs. Bateham belonged to the Congregational church before becoming a Presbyterian.

Josephine Penfield Cushman Bateham died in Oberlin, March 15, 1901, and was buried in Painesville.

Selected works

Books
 Sabbath Observance Manual (1892)

Hymns
 "We'll all rise up together"

Edited volumes
 The invalid singer; life and writings of Minnie D. Bateham, by Mrs. J. C. Bateham (1895)

References

External links
 
 

1829 births
1901 deaths
People from Erie County, New York
American social activists
American temperance activists
19th-century American non-fiction writers
19th-century American women writers
19th-century American newspaper editors
Women newspaper editors
Oberlin College alumni
Wikipedia articles incorporating text from A Woman of the Century